"I Feel Better" is a song by the Belgian-Australian musician Gotye from his third studio album Making Mirrors. It was released as a digital download on 25 October 2011 in Australia. The song was written/produced by Gotye. It was almost as successful as "Somebody That I Used To Know" in certain countries. The song has charted in Flanders. The trumpet melody which is used in the intro and the bridge was sampled from "Brazil" by Edmundo Ros.

Track listing

Personnel
Wally De Backer – lead & backing vocals, drums, percussion, piano, dulcimer, horn samples
Lucas Taranto – bass guitar
Luke Hodgson – bass guitar

Chart performance

Release history

In popular culture
The chorus of "I Feel Better" featured in an episode of The Simpsons titled "Whiskey Business".

References

2011 singles
Gotye songs
Songs written by Gotye
Eleven: A Music Company singles
2011 songs